An athlete (also sportsman or sportswoman) is a person who competes in one or more sports that involve physical strength, speed, or endurance.

Athletes may be professionals or amateurs. Most professional athletes have particularly well-developed physiques obtained by extensive physical training and strict exercise accompanied by a strict dietary regimen.

Definitions

Physiology

Athletes involved in isotonic exercises have an increased mean left ventricular end-diastolic volume and are less likely to be depressed. Due to their strenuous physical activities, athletes are far more likely than the general population to visit massage salons and pay for services from massotherapists and masseurs. Athletes whose sport requires endurance more than strength usually have a lower calorie intake than other athletes.

"Athlete Genes" 
While athleticism is largely influenced by environmental factors, it has been theorized that genetic expression may play a moderate role in an athlete's abilities as well. Exploring this claim, meta-analyses of studies regarding two specific genes, angiotensin-converting enzyme (ACE) gene and ACTN3, concluded that certain variations in expression may have a moderate effect on athletic performance; the former being more prevalent in endurance-based events and the latter in power-based events. Further studies on these and other genetic polymorphisms linked to athletic performance were recommended.

Titles

"All-round athlete"
An "all-round athlete" is a person who competes in multiple sports at a high level. Examples of people who played more than one sport professionally include Jim Thorpe, Lionel Conacher, Deion Sanders, Danny Ainge, Babe Zaharias and Erin Phillips. Others include Ricky Williams, Bo Jackson and Damon Allen, each of whom was drafted both by Major League Baseball and by professional gridiron football leagues such as the NFL and the CFL. Another female example is Heather Moyse, a multiple Winter Olympic gold medalist in bobsled and member of the World Rugby Hall of Fame who also represented Canada internationally in track cycling and competed at university level in basketball and track and field. Japanese athletes such as Kazushi Sakuraba, Kazuyuki Fujita, Masakatsu Funaki and Naoya Ogawa have successfully performed in professional wrestling and competed in mixed martial arts.

"World's Greatest Athlete"
The title of "World's Greatest Athlete" traditionally belongs to the world's top competitor in the decathlon (males) and heptathlon (females) in track and field. The decathlon consists of 10 events: 100 meters, long jump, shot put, high jump, 400 meters, 110 m hurdles, discus, pole vault, javelin, and 1500 m. The heptathlon consists of seven events: the 100 m hurdles, high jump, shot put, 200 meters, long jump, javelin, and 800 meters. These competitions require an athlete to possess the whole spectrum of athletic ability in order to be successful including speed, strength, coordination, jumping ability, and endurance.

Although the title "World's Greatest Athlete" seems a natural fit for these two events, its traditional association with the decathlon/heptathlon officially began with Jim Thorpe. During the 1912 Olympics in Stockholm, Sweden, Thorpe won the gold medal in the Decathlon (among others). Thorpe competed professionally in baseball, American football, and basketball; and competed collegiately in track and field, baseball, lacrosse, and did ballroom dancing. King Gustav V of Sweden, while awarding Thorpe the decathlon gold, said: "Sir, you are the greatest athlete in the world." That title has been associated with the decathlon event ever since.

See also 
Athletics
Sportswear (activewear)
Outdoor enthusiast
Jock (athlete)
Athlete of the Year
Women's sports
Olympic Games athletes are also known as 'Olympians'

References

Sports occupations and roles
Sports terminology